Liu Shaozi was a nephew of Liu Congxiao, a warlord late in the Chinese Five Dynasties and Ten Kingdoms Period.  Under some traditional accounts, he briefly controlled Qingyuan Circuit (headquartered in modern Quanzhou, Fujian) after his uncle Liu Congxiao's death before being overthrown by the officers Chen Hongjin and Zhang Hansi.

Liu Congxiao had controlled Qingyuan as its military governor (Jiedushi) ever since then late 940s.  As he was sonless, he adopted both Liu Shaozi and Liu Shaozi's older brother Liu Shaoji as his sons.  (Both Liu Shaoji and Liu Shaozi were biological sons of Liu Congxiao's older brother Liu Congyuan  Liu Congxiao apparently died in 962, while being vassals of both Southern Tang and Song.  Under the account given in the Xu Zizhi Tongjian (also adopted in the Spring and Autumn Annals of the Ten Kingdoms), after Liu Congxiao's death, as Liu Shaoji was then on a tributary mission sent by Liu Congxiao to the Southern Tang court, Liu Shaozi took over as acting military governor.  However, not long after, Chen seized him and falsely accused him of planning to submit to Wuyue, and then delivered him to Southern Tang and supported Zhang as the new acting military governor.  Under the account in the History of Song, the coup happened before Liu Congxiao's death, and therefore (implicitly) Liu Shaozi never controlled the circuit—but under Chen's biography, it gave the same account as the Xu Zizhi Tongjian (i.e., the coup was during Liu Shaozi's rule).  What Liu Shaozi's fate was after being delivered to Southern Tang was not recorded in history.

Notes and references 

 History of Song, vol. 483.
 Spring and Autumn Annals of the Ten Kingdoms, vol. 93.
 Xu Zizhi Tongjian, vol. 2.

|- style="text-align: center;

10th-century births
Hokkien people
Politicians from Quanzhou
Generals from Fujian
Southern Tang politicians
Southern Tang generals
Song dynasty politicians from Fujian
Song dynasty generals
Year of death unknown